The Democratic Alliance Party (Alyans) is a political party in Haiti. In the presidential elections of 7 February 2006, its candidate Evans Paul won 2.5% of the popular vote. In November 2016, Paul became the prime minister under Jovenel Moïse. The party won in the 7 February 2006 Senate elections 6.1% of the popular vote and 1 out of 30 Senators.  In the 7 February and 21 April 2006 Chamber of Deputies elections, the party won 10 out of 99 seats.

Political parties in Haiti
Political parties with year of establishment missing